John Walker Chidsey (born June 11, 1962) is an American businessman and attorney who has served as CEO of Subway since November 2019. He was formerly the executive chairman and CEO of Burger King Corporation. He is a director and member of the audit committee for HealthSouth Corporation. He previously was chairman and CEO for two corporate divisions of Cendant Corporation from January 1996 to March 2003.

Early life
Chidsey earned a bachelor's degree from Davidson College in Davidson, North Carolina, an MBA in finance and accounting from Emory University in Atlanta, Georgia, and a juris doctor from Emory University School of Law. He is a certified public accountant and a member of the State Bar of Georgia.

Career
Chidsey was the CFO of Pepsi-Cola Eastern Europe and the CFO of PepsiCo World Trading Co. Inc.

References

External links
John W. Chidsey III at Martindale-Hubbell
Biography of John W. Chidsey from Bloomberg.com

American chief executives of food industry companies
Living people
1962 births
Burger King people
Emory University alumni
Emory University School of Law alumni
Davidson College alumni
Georgia (U.S. state) lawyers
People from Coral Gables, Florida
Businesspeople from Florida